Gayville may refer to:

Gayville, Oswego County, New York, a hamlet
Gayville, Putnam County, New York, a hamlet
Gayville, South Dakota, a town in Yankton County
Gayville, Lawrence County, South Dakota, an unincorporated community